Smržovka is a town in Jablonec nad Nisou District in the Liberec Region of the Czech Republic. It has about 3,800 inhabitants.

Etymology

The name Smržovka was given to town by overgrown mountain forest, where there was a large amount of morels.

Geography
It lies in the Jizera Mountains. The Kamenice River flows along the northeastern municipal border.

History
Smržovka was founded in the first half of the 16th century during the colonization of the Jizera Mountains, the first written mention of the village is from 1568.

In the 19th century, glassmaking developed in the town, which helped the rapid growth of the town. In 1868, Smržovka was promoted to a market town, and in 1905, it became a town.

Smržovka was part of the Jablonec nad Nisou District, one of the 94 districts in Kingdom of Bohemia. With the development of industry in and around Smržovka, it develops mainly glassworks, grinding shops and weaving and Smržovka in 1849 became the market place. In 1905 Smržovka was promoted to town.

During the German occupation of Czechoslovakia in February and March 1945, the Germans operated a subcamp of the Gross-Rosen concentration camp, whose prisoners were 300 women.

Demographics

Economy

In 1991, the Kaipan company, a Czech car manufacturer with a focus on sports roadsters, was founded here.

Transport
Koleje Dolnośląskie D21 line runs from Liberec to Szklarska Poręba via the town.

Sights
The landmark of the town is the Church of Saint Michael the Archangel. It was built in the Baroque style in 1767–1781.

On Černá studnice mountain there is an eponymous observation tower. It belongs to the highest stone observation towers in the Jizera Mountains.

Twin towns – sister cities

Smržovka is twinned with:
 Rammenau, Germany
 Weidenberg, Germany

Partner towns
Smržovka also cooperates with:
 Juchnowiec Kościelny, Poland
 Plouhinec, France
 Unsere Liebe Frau im Walde-St. Felix, Italy

References

External links

Cities and towns in the Czech Republic
Populated places in Jablonec nad Nisou District
16th-century establishments in Bohemia
Populated places established in the 16th century